John Hightower IV (born May 31, 1996) is an American football wide receiver for the Los Angeles Chargers of the National Football League (NFL). He played college football at Boise State and was drafted by the Philadelphia Eagles in the fifth round of the 2020 NFL Draft.

Early years
Hightower attended Riverdale Baptist School in Upper Marlboro, Maryland.

College career
Hightower originally attended Hinds Community College for two years before attending Boise State University. In the two years at Hinds, he had 31 receptions for 509 yards and seven touchdowns. During his first year at Boise State in 2018, Hightower started four of 10 games, recording 31 receptions for 504 yards and six touchdowns. In his senior season in 2019, he started 13 of 14 games and had 51 receptions for 943 yards and eight touchdowns.

Professional career

Philadelphia Eagles
Hightower was drafted by the Philadelphia Eagles in the fifth round with the 168th overall pick of the 2020 NFL Draft.

On August 31, 2021, Hightower was waived by the Eagles and re-signed to the practice squad the next day. He was placed on the COVID list on December 28 and activated seven days later. He signed a reserve/future contract with the Eagles on February 3, 2022.

On August 30, 2022, Hightower was waived by the Eagles.

Los Angeles Chargers
On September 28, 2022, Hightower was signed to the Los Angeles Chargers practice squad. He signed a reserve/future contract on January 17, 2023.

References

External links
Philadelphia Eagles bio
Boise State Broncos bio

1996 births
Living people
People from Landover, Maryland
Sportspeople from the Washington metropolitan area
Players of American football from Maryland
American football wide receivers
Hinds Eagles football players
Boise State Broncos football players
Philadelphia Eagles players
Los Angeles Chargers players